Novaya Slobodka is a rural locality (a village) in Korneyevsky Selsoviet, Meleuzovsky District, Bashkortostan, Russia. The population was 14 as of 2010. There is 1 street.

Geography 
Novaya Slobodka is located 49 km northwest of Meleuz (the district's administrative centre) by road. Sukharevka is the nearest rural locality.

References 

Rural localities in Meleuzovsky District